Matthias Engelsberger  (18 July 1925 – 20 October 2005) was a German politician representative of the Christian Social Union in Bavaria (CSU). Between 1969 and 1990, he was a member of the Bundestag of Germany.

See also
List of Bavarian Christian Social Union politicians

Christian Social Union in Bavaria politicians
1925 births
2005 deaths
Officers Crosses of the Order of Merit of the Federal Republic of Germany